NGC 703 is a lenticular galaxy located 240 million light-years away in the constellation Andromeda. The galaxy was discovered by astronomer William Herschel on September 21, 1786 and is also a member of Abell 262.

NGC 703 is classified as a radio galaxy.

See also
 List of NGC objects (1–1000)

References

External links
 

703
6957
Andromeda (constellation)
Astronomical objects discovered in 1786
Lenticular galaxies
Abell 262
1346
Radio galaxies